Jonathan Bates (1 November 1939 – 31 October 2008) was an English sound editor. He was nominated for an Academy Award in the category of Best Sound for the film Gandhi. and won a BAFTA in 1988 for his work on the film Cry Freedom alongside long-term collaborators Gerry Humphreys and Simon Kaye.

Early life 
Jonathan Bates was born at home on 1 November 1939, the youngest of the four children of author H. E. Bates. He was a pupil at The King's School, Canterbury and had early ambitions to become a jet pilot, but was influenced to work in the movies due to his father's relationship with the director David Lean.

Career 
Jonathan Bates began his film career at Ealing Studios, Borehamwood as a runner and trainee soon after leaving school in 1956, and eventually became a Sound editor. He worked on over 65 films between 1959 and 2007 and was most associated with the films of Brian G. Hutton, Jack Gold, Lewis Gilbert and Richard Attenborough with whom he collaborated on numerous productions.

Personal life 
In 1966 Bates married Jennifer Thompson whilst shooting Hotel Paradiso in Paris. He had first met her whilst working on the 1961 production of Whistle Down the Wind, where she was an also an assistant dubbing editor. They remained married until his death in 2007. The union produced a son, Tim and a daughter, Catherine. Bates retired in 2003 and was also a passionate cricketer and played for Twickenham All-Stars. He died in 2008 after being diagnosed with a brain tumour.

Awards

Selected filmography

References

External links

Obituary in The Guardian newspaper
Obituary in The Independent newspaper
Obituary in The Times newspaper

1939 births
2008 deaths
English audio engineers
People from Little Chart
Best Sound BAFTA Award winners